Barradas is a surname of Portuguese and Spanish language. Notable people with the surname include:

Carmen Barradas (1888–1963), Uruguayan pianist, composer, and choral teacher
Gregorio Barradas Miravete (1982–2010), Mexican politician for the National Action Party
Huáscar Barradas (born 1964), Venezuelan flautist and professor
Isidro Barradas, Spanish general sent to Mexico in 1829 to try to reconquer the country for the Spanish Crown
João Barradas, Portuguese accordionist and composer
Rafael Barradas (1890–1929), Uruguayan painter and artist
Sebastião Barradas, Portuguese exegete and preacher

See also
Barradas III, a Star Trek planet
Estadio Manoel Barradas, a multi-purpose stadium in Salvador, Brazil

Portuguese-language surnames
Spanish-language surnames